The Philippines women's national football team has qualified to the FIFA Women's World Cup in one occasion, the 2023 FIFA Women's World Cup. The Women's World Cup will also be the country's debut at any major FIFA football competition in their history.

2023 World Cup

The Philippines qualified for their very first FIFA Women's World Cup via their 2022 AFC Women's Asian Cup semifinal finish. This is the first time the country qualified for a FIFA World Cup of any gender or age level. Their Asian Cup campaign was led by Australian tactician Alen Stajcic who was appointed as head coach in October 2021. They secured their place in the 2023 FIFA Women's World Cup when they beat Chinese Taipei in the quarterfinals on penalties following a 1–1 draw. They end their campaign with a 0–2 defeat to South Korea in the semifinal.

For the 2023 World Cup group stage, the Philippines were drawn to play against co-host New Zealand, Norway, and Switzerland. Among these national teams, the Philippines has only faced New Zealand in an international match recently, a 1–2 loss on September 7, 2022.

Group A

FIFA World Cup record

*Draws include knockout matches decided on penalty kicks.

References

 
World Cup
Countries at the FIFA Women's World Cup